Brandon & Leah were an American-based indie pop group made up of former husband and wife team Brandon Jenner and Leah Felder.

Brandon and Leah have known each other since they were in middle school and began playing music together in high school. They were married on May 31, 2012 in Hawaii outside the St. Regis Princeville Resort.

Their sound has been described as indie pop, hip-hop based reggae, and electro-pop-soul. They are influenced by soul, reggae, pop, and hip-hop.

The group met popularity when their single, "Showstopper" was used as the theme song for Kourtney and Kim Take Miami on E! Entertainment. Initially Brandon and Leah were signed to Warner Bros. Records, but they soon opted to release their music on their own.

Along with Tony Berg, they produced their debut EP, Cronies, which was released on April 9, 2013. It has reached #82 on the Billboard 200, #16 on the Billboard Independent Albums Chart, and #24 on the Billboard Digital Albums chart. They released their second EP, Together, on October 14, 2014.

They previously performed together in a band called Big Dume.

In September 2018, Brandon and Leah announced that Leah filed for divorce. Their date of separation was July 10, 2018, and date of dissolution was July 15, 2019.

Members

Brandon Jenner
Brandon William Jenner was born in Los Angeles, California, on June 4, 1981 to reality television personality and retired Olympics champion Caitlyn Jenner and actress Linda Thompson. He is the half-brother to Burton "Burt" and Cassandra "Casey" Marino through Caitlyn's marriage to Chrystie Crownover, which lasted from 1972 until 1981. Jenner is the older brother of Brody Jenner, also a reality-television personality.

After Jenner's parents divorced in 1985, Caitlyn Jenner married Kris Kardashian, the ex-wife of attorney Robert Kardashian, in 1991. Consequently, Jenner became a stepbrother of Kourtney, Kim, Khloé, and Rob Kardashian. Kris gave birth to his half-sisters Kendall and Kylie Jenner in 1995 and 1997.

With his younger brother, Brody, he was on the TV reality show The Princes of Malibu. He appears on the reality shows Keeping Up with the Kardashians and Kourtney and Kim Take Miami.
Brandon welcomed twins with his girlfriend Cayley in January 2020.

Leah Felder
Leah Elizabeth Felder (previously Jenner) was born in Malibu, California on November 24, 1982 to former Eagles guitarist Don Felder and Susan Felder. Along with ex-husband Brandon, she appeared on the reality TV shows Keeping Up with the Kardashians and Kourtney and Kim Take Miami.

Brandon and Leah were married in Hawaii on May 31, 2012. On March 15, 2015, she announced that she and her husband Brandon were expecting their first child together. She gave birth to a baby girl named Eva James Jenner on July 22, 2015.
Brandon and Leah separated in 2018.

Discography 
EP:
 Cronies (Ear Fetish Records, 2013)
 Together (Ear Fetish Records, 2014)

References

External links
 

Indie pop groups from California
Jenner family
Married couples
Kardashian family